The basic law of copyright in Malaysia is under the Copyright Act 1987 which came into force on 1 December 1987. The law has undergone various significant updates since then, with amendments to the Act taking effect in 1990, 1999, 2000 and 2003.

References

External links
Copyright Issues in Malaysia 12th ABU Copyright Committee Meeting and Seminar, Brunei 15-17 May 2006.
The Official Website of the Intellectual Property Corporation of Malaysia (MyIPO).
Malaysian Copyright Act 1987

 
Malaysia